Ebria is a genus of rhizaria.

It includes the species Ebria tripartita.

References

Cercozoa genera